The 1964 British Open Championship was held at the Lansdowne Club in London from 25 November - 4 December 1963.
Roshan Khan seeded four pulled out of the main draw with an elbow injury to be replaced by lucky loser Sami Nadim. Abdelfattah Abou Taleb defeated Mike Oddy in the final. Aftab Jawaid won the third place play off by beating defending champion Mo Khan 9-6 5-9 5-9 10-8 9-1.

Seeds

Draw and results

First qualifying round
 Sherif Afifi beat  Peter Fuente w/o

 John Skinner beat  Terry Pickering 3-9 9-1 9-10 9-3 9-1

 Arthur Catherine beat  Henry Macintosh 4-9 6-9 9-7 9-4 9-7

 Richard Hawkey beat  John Mocatte 9-5 9-3 9-4

 Maged Abaza beat  Ken Watson 2-9 9-6 9-1 9-0

 Samir Nadim beat  George Chisholm 9-6 9-5 10-9

 Jeremy Lyon beat  Tony Gathercole 6-9 9-1 9-3 9-4

 Aly Abdel Aziz beat  Pat Kirton 9-0 9-3 9-1

 Mike Corby beat  Sharif Khan 9-5 9-7 9-3

Second qualifying round
 Lyon beat  Nadim 9-1 1-9 5-9 10-9 10-8

 Catherine beat  Richard Hawkey 9-7 9-3 5-9 5-9 9-5

 Gerald Massy beat  Abaza 9-3 9-0 9-1

 Skinner beat  Afifi 9-5 9-0 10-9

 Aziz	beat  Corby 9-6 9-1 4-9 9-6

Main draw

References

Men's British Open Squash Championships
Men's British Open Championship
Men's British Open Squash Championship
Men's British Open Squash Championship
Men's British Open Squash Championship
Men's British Open Squash Championship
Squash competitions in London